Beybienkoana is a genus of crickets in the subfamily Euscyrtinae.  Species can be found mostly in Africa, Asia and Australia.

Species 
Beybienkoana includes the following species:
Beybienkoana africana Chopard, 1962
Beybienkoana australica Chopard, 1925
Beybienkoana bakboensis Gorochov, 1988 - type species
Beybienkoana ditrapeza Liu & Shi, 2012
Beybienkoana formosana Shiraki, 1930
Beybienkoana gregaria Yang & Yang, 2012
Beybienkoana karnyi Shiraki, 1930
Beybienkoana longecaudata Chopard, 1925
Beybienkoana longipennis Liu & Yin, 1993
Beybienkoana luteola Yang & Yang, 2012
Beybienkoana majora Liu & Shi, 2012
Beybienkoana parvula Shi & Liu, 2007
Beybienkoana splendida Yang & Yang, 2012
Beybienkoana tenuis Bey-Bienko, 1966
Beybienkoana trapeza Liu & Shi, 2012

References

External links
 

Ensifera genera
crickets
Orthoptera of Asia
Orthoptera of Africa